Adopt-a-Pet.com  is North America's largest non-profit pet-adoption web service that advocates pet adoption, gathering information from over 12,000 pet shelters in the U.S. and Canada, and presenting adoptable pet data in a searchable data base to facilitate pet adoption. Adopt-a-pet.com is registered in Redondo Beach, California, as Humane America Animal Foundation.  The web site allows people to sign up to receive an email when a pet that satisfies their criteria appears in a local shelter.  Adopt-a-Pet.com also contains information on pet care for first-time pet owners and publishes a newsletter.  The web site also lists volunteer opportunities and promotes spaying and neutering of the pets.

In addition, Adopt-a-Pet.com promotes pet adoption through conventional and social media presence, public service announcements, and interactions with local governments. Currently, Adopt-a-Pet.com is sponsored by Nestlé Purina and Bayer Animal Health. Martha Stewart features Adopt-a-pet.com search engine on her blog. Since 2015 Adopt-a-pet.com has been offering its visitors manuals for pets.

History 
Adopt-a-Pet.com was founded in 2000 by David Meyer, Amy Luwis, and Doug McKee as 1-800-Save-a-Pet.com. Initially, 1-800-Save-a-Pet.com was a program designed to end the overpopulation of companion animals in shelters in Los Angeles, California. The program was based on a year of research about the problem and proposed scientifically based solutions and projections.

In the aftermath of Hurricane Katrina, 1-800-Save-a-Pet.com participated in the pet rescue effort by helping reunite pets with their owners and helping the pets that could not be reunited find either foster or new homes.

In September 2008, the company changed its name to Adopt-a-Pet.com. In October 2008, Adopt-a-Pet.com partnered with Care2 to launch America's Favorite Animal Shelter contest. The winning shelters were awarded a total of $20000 worth of prizes on December 4, 2008. The contest took place again in 2009.

In January 2009, Adopt-a-Pet.com launched a national ADOPT campaign accompanied by a poster created by Shepard Fairey using a photo by Clay Myers to raise awareness about adoption at the time President Obama was looking for a dog for his family. This poster was on the cover of the Spring 2009 issue of Dog's Life Magazine and was fashioned after Fairey's Obama Hope poster.

In April 2009, Adopt-a-Pet.com expanded its search to include, in addition to cats and dogs, rabbits, birds, small animals (such as hamsters and guinea pigs), farm-type animals, horses, amphibians, reptiles, and fish. In May the same year, it launched a social media campaign, "Social Petworking", introducing the capability to share a photo of an adoptable pet on a Facebook page or to attach it to an e-mail.

In June 2010, Adopt-a-Pet.com paid tribute to Rue McClanahan, who was known as an actress and a supporter of pet adoption.

In 2011, White Sox pitcher Mark Buehrle and his wife Jamie partnered with Adopt-a-Pet.com to create a public service billboard campaign to promote pet adoption.

Management 
President and CEO: David Meyer
Executive Director: Abbie Moore

References

External links

Non-profit organizations based in California
Online companies of Canada
Online companies of the United States
Organizations established in 2000